Kılıç is a Turkish word meaning "sword" and may refer to:

Places
 Kılıç, Anamur, a village in Anamur district of Mersin Province, Turkey
 Kılıç, Gerger, a village in Gerger district of Adıyaman Province, Turkey

Other uses
 Kılıç (surname)
 Kılıç class fast attack craft, a missile boat class of the Turkish Navy
 Kılıç Ali Pasha Complex, a religious building complex in Beyoğlu, Istanbul built in the 16th century 
 TCG Kılıç Ali Paşa, two destroyers of the Turkish Navy

See also
 Kilij, Turkish saber